Chabashim may refer to:

 Yemenite Jews 
 Beta Israel or Ethiopian Jews